Scharoun may refer to:

Scharoun Ensemble, chamber music ensemble
Hans Scharoun (1893−1972), German architect